Ainda: Original Motion Picture Soundtrack From The Film «Lisbon Story» is a soundtrack album by Portuguese group Madredeus for the 1994 film Lisbon Story, directed by Wim Wenders. It was released on 7 March 1995 by EMI-Valentim de Carvalho.

Recording 
Ainda was recorded between 27 March and 5 May 1994 at the Great Linford Manor and Lansdowne Recording Studios, in England. Recording and mixing were done by António Pinheiro da Silva and Jonathan Miller. The mixing was done at the Tritonius Studios in Berlin, in October 1994.

The bonus track "Maio Maduro Maio" was recorded on 4 and 5 October 1993 at the Estúdio Angel 2.

Track listing

Personnel 
Credits are adapted from the album's inner notes.

Madredeus

 Teresa Salgueiro – vocals
 José Peixoto – guitar
 Pedro Ayres Magalhães – guitar
 Francisco Ribeiro – cello
 Gabriel Gomes – accordion
 Rodrigo Leão – keyboard

Production

 Pedro Ayres Magalhães – production, artistic direction, arrangements, cover concept
 António Pinheiro da Silva – recording
 Jonathan Miller – recording, remixing (track 10)
 Andy Griffin – assistant in Linford Manor
 Mark Tucker – assistant in Lansdowne
 Thomas Juhl – assistant engineers
 Marko Berknir – assistant engineers
 Ingo Steinbech – digital mastering
 António Cunha – executive production

Charts

References 

Madredeus albums
EMI Records albums
1995 albums
Portuguese music